Mohamad Ahmad Atwi (10 January 1987 – 18 September 2020) was a Lebanese footballer who played as an attacking midfielder.

Atwi started his career at Olympic Beirut in 2004, remaining there in 2005 when they changed their name to AC Tripoli. He moved to Tadamon Sour in 2006, and then to Ansar in 2008, where he stayed for nine seasons. Atwi returned to Tadamon Sour on loan in 2017, and then moved to Akhaa Ahli Aley in 2018. Atwi also represented the Lebanon national team between 2011 and 2014, playing a game in the 2014 World Cup qualifiers.

On 21 August 2020, Atwi was hit in the head by a stray bullet. He died on 18 September 2020, after nearly one month in intensive care.

Club career 
Atwi began his career in 2004 at Olympic Beirut in the Lebanese Premier League, staying with the club the next season when they became AC Tripoli. Atwi then moved to Tadamon Sour in 2006, staying there two seasons, before moving to back-to-back league champions Ansar in 2008. He stayed at the Beirut-based club for nine seasons, returning Tadamon Sour on a season-long loan in 2017. In 2018 Atwi moved to Akhaa Ahli Aley, where he remained until his death in 2020.

International career 
Atwi made his debut for the Lebanon national team on 11 June 2013, coming off the bench to replace Mahmoud Kojok in the 67th minute of a 4–0 loss to Iran in a 2014 World Cup qualifier.

Death 
At around 10am on 21 August 2020, Atwi was hit by a stray bullet to the head in the Cola area of Beirut, Lebanon, during the funeral of a firefighter who died at the 2020 Beirut explosion. He was rushed unconscious to the Makassed General Hospital, where he was given 16 units of blood due to extensive hemorrhaging. The medical staff was able to stop the bleeding without being able to extract the bullet, as it was located in a sensitive area of the brain. He was put in intensive care, in a medically-induced coma.

On 24 August, Atwi's brother, Ali, stated that he was looking to sue whoever was behind the stray shot. On the morning of 18 September 2020, Atwi died from his injuries.

Honours 
Ansar
 Lebanese FA Cup: 2009–10, 2011–12, 2016–17
 Lebanese Super Cup: 2012

Individual
 Lebanese Premier League Best Goal: 2010–11, 2015–16

Notes

References

External links

 
 
 
 

1987 births
2020 deaths
Lebanese footballers
Lebanon international footballers
Association football midfielders
AC Tripoli players
Tadamon Sour SC players
Al Ansar FC players
Akhaa Ahli Aley FC players
Olympic Beirut players
People from Nabatieh District
Deaths by firearm in Lebanon